My Classic Car is a television show about classic automobiles, hosted by Dennis Gage. It was originally broadcast on TNN, and Speed Channel, followed by MAVtv and Velocity. As of 2019 the show airs on the Motor Trend network. It was produced by MadStache, who also created Popular Hot Rodding Television, Corbin’s Ride On and Texas Hardtails.

The host of the show, Dennis Gage, is known for his seemingly boundless enthusiasm, his trademark handlebar moustache and the catchphrase with which he ends every episode, "Honor the timeless classics."

The series features major classic automobile shows and collections, usually in the United States but occasionally in other countries, including Canada and the United Kingdom.  Some episodes focus on celebrities and prolific car collectors such as talk show host Jay Leno.  Every episode also features a segment now sponsored by  Autogeek Garage, a source for auto detailing supplies, car wax, car care products, car polishes, auto accessories, polishers, and car detailing tools.

References

External links 
 
 
 DrCarPolisher
 Motorcycle Classics article on Dennis Gage's affinity for motorcycles and how his TV show started
 Nostalgic Radio and Cars Podcast (12-21-2011) - Dennis Gage radio interview (beings at 22:28)

Speed (TV network) original programming
2000s American television series
2010s American television series
1997 American television series debuts
Motorsport mass media in the United States
2020s American television series